Paul Peterson (born July 29, 1980) is an American football coach and former player.  He is the head football coach at Utah Tech University, formerly named Dixie State University, in St. George, Utah, a position he has held since the 2019 season.  Peterson played college football as quarterback at Boston College. He was the first Boston College quarterback to start his career 6–0, and compiled a 12–2 record for his career with the Boston College Eagles, including two bowl game victories, in the 2003 San Francisco Bowl and 2004 Continental Tire Bowl. He was named the Big East Offensive Player of the Week twice, the MVP of the Continental Tire Bowl, and BC's team MVP in 2004.

Playing career

High school
Peterson was an all-state selection as junior and senior at Bingham High School in South Jordan, Utah. He holds the school's single-season record for passing yardage (2,011) and career record for passing yards (3,900). He totaled 38 touchdown passes including 20 in his senior season. He also played baseball and basketball. After high school, Peterson served a two-year Mormon mission in Nicaragua (August 1999–July 2001).

Junior college
Peterson played the 2001 and 2002 seasons at Snow College, a junior college in Ephraim, Utah. In 2001, he threw for 2,518 yards and 20 touchdowns. In 2002, he earned JC Grid-Wire All-America honors and All-Western States Football League first team honors after leading the Badgers to an 8–2 record, throwing for 2,982 yards and 35 touchdowns in 10 games. He led the National Junior College Athletic Association (NJCAA) in both passing yards and touchdowns.

Boston College

2003 season
After starting the year as a backup, Peterson came on strong at the end of the season to win the starting quarterback job from Quinton Porter, leading the Eagles to wins in each of their last three games. He completed 16-of-25 passes for 224 yards and two touchdowns to lead the team to a 35–21 win over Colorado State in the Diamond Walnut San Francisco Bowl. He finished the season completing 84 of 147 passes for 1,124 yards, 10 touchdowns, and seven interceptions.

2004 season
Peterson won Big East Offensive Player of the Week twice, Big East Co-Offensive Player of the Week once, and Big East Offensive Player once. He started 10 games until missing the season finale due to a fractured second metacarpal in his right (throwing) hand late in the second quarter against Temple. Peterson came back to complete 24 of 33 passes for 236 yards and two touchdowns in BC's 37–24 win over North Carolina in the Continental Tire Bowl before exiting the game in the second half with a broken leg. However, he still earned game MVP honors. Megan, his wife, picked up his trophy on the field after the game. He finished the season with 2,594 passing yards, 18 touchdowns, and 10 interceptions.

Peterson concluded his career with 3,718 yards (eighth all time), 28 touchdowns (sixth all time), and a 60.8 completion percentage (sixth all time).

CFL
Peterson signed with the Ottawa Renegades of the Canadian Football League (CFL) before the 2005 season. He was released after week 10.

Coaching career
Peterson was a graduate assistant at Brigham Young University (BYU) in 2006 and at North Carolina State University in 2007. In 2008, Peterson joined Southern Utah University coaching staff as the quarterbacks and wide receivers coach. Peterson was hired as the 21st head football coach at Snow College on January 23, 2017. He then took the Head coaching position at Dixie State University on December 2, 2018.

Personal life
Peterson is the sixth of ten children. His older brother, Charlie, is a former BYU quarterback who played professionally in the Arena Football League (AFL) and Canadian Football League (CFL)

Head coaching record

College

References

External links
 Dixie State profile
 Boston College profile

1980 births
Living people
20th-century Mormon missionaries
21st-century Mormon missionaries
American expatriates in Nicaragua
American football quarterbacks
American Mormon missionaries
Boston College Eagles football players
BYU Cougars football coaches
Utah Tech Trailblazers football coaches
Mormon missionaries in Nicaragua
NC State Wolfpack football coaches
Ottawa Renegades coaches
Sacramento State Hornets football coaches
Snow Badgers football coaches
Snow Badgers football players
Southern Utah Thunderbirds football coaches
Sportspeople from Allentown, Pennsylvania
People from South Jordan, Utah
Coaches of American football from Utah
Players of American football from Utah
Latter Day Saints from Utah